Nimriwali or Neemriwali is a village in Bhiwani district of the Indian state of Haryana. It lies approximately 09 km (BHIWANI to Charkhi-Dadri road) south of the district headquarters town of Bhiwani. It's 265 km from State capital Chandigarh and 120 km from Rajdhani Delhi. Neemriwali is a large village of Haryana with total 542 families residing. The Nimriwali village has population of 2945 of which 1563 are males while 1382 are females as per Population Census 2011. 
In Neemriwali village have a husyant  furniture works and Gill shopping mart which has famous in haryana.
In Neemriwali village population of children with age 0-6 is 375 which makes up 12.73% of the village population. Average Sex Ratio of Neemriwali village is 884 which is higher than Haryana state average of 879. Child Sex Ratio for the Neemriwali as per census is 838— higher than Haryana average of 834. 

Neemriwali village has lower literacy rate compared to Haryana. In 2011, literacy rate of Nimriwali village was 73.42% compared to 75.55% of Haryana. In Nimriwali Male literacy stands at 86.83% while female literacy rate was 58.38 %. 

As per constitution of India and Panchyati Raaj Act, Nimriwali village is administrated by Sarpanch (Head of Village) who is elected representative of village.

References

Villages in Bhiwani district